George Charles Boldt Sr. (April 25, 1851 – December 5, 1916) was a Prussian-born American hotelier. A self-made millionaire, he influenced the development of the urban hotel as a civic social center and luxury destination.

Life and career
He was born as Georg Karl Boldt in Bergen auf Rügen, Prussia, on April 25, 1851. He immigrated to the United States in 1864. He began as a kitchen worker in New York and, at age 25, was hired (by his future father-in-law) to manage the dining room of Philadelphia's most exclusive gentlemen's club, The Philadelphia Club.

Boldt's first hotel was the Bellevue (1881), at the northwest corner of Broad & Walnut Streets, in Philadelphia. He soon bought a competing hotel, the Stratford, at the southwest corner. Two decades later, on the site of the Stratford, he built the largest hotel the city had ever seen, the 1,090-room Bellevue-Stratford Hotel (1902–04, now the Hyatt).

The enormous fortunes generated by robber barons in the post-Civil War Era led to an unprecedented level of luxurious living for wealthy Americans. Boldt catered to this new super-rich class, charging the highest prices for the very best, and becoming one of them in the process.

William Waldorf Astor built the Waldorf Hotel (1890–93) in New York City, with Boldt as proprietor. John Jacob Astor IV built the adjoining Astoria Hotel (1897). Boldt mediated between the feuding millionaire cousins, leasing the Astoria himself, and merging the two buildings under his management as the Waldorf-Astoria Hotel. The Empire State Building now occupies its site at 34th Street and 5th Avenue. He is credited with popularizing Thousand Island dressing at the Waldorf-Astoria Hotel, where he instructed the maître d', Oscar Tschirky, to include it on the menu. The hotel introduced other popular food items, such as Waldorf Salad. Boldt also owned the Waldorf Astoria Segar Company, which imported fine Cuban cigars and was located at the hotel.

He built Boldt Castle on an island in the Thousand Islands area of New York State. The enormous castle was intended as a gift for his wife, Louise Kehrer Boldt, but when she died suddenly on January 7, 1904, in Manhattan, at the age of 43, construction was halted. The castle, near Alexandria Bay, was restored after decades of vandalism and is now a major summer tourist attraction.

Towards the end of his life, he commissioned architect Francis T. Underhill to build him a Swiss-chalet-style mansion, "La Manzanita," in Montecito, Santa Barbara, California.

Boldt died on December 5, 1916, in Manhattan, New York City of a heart attack. He was buried in Woodlawn Cemetery, Bronx, New York.

Legacy
Boldt once owned Nikola Tesla's Wardenclyffe Tower property, receiving it as payment for a debt. Tesla mortgaged the property to Boldt and the Waldorf-Astoria to pay the costs of his residence at the hotel when he encountered financial difficulties.  Tesla did so first in 1904 and again in 1908; he was unable to repay the mortgages.  Boldt and the Waldorf-Astoria foreclosed on the property in 1915.

He was a trustee of Cornell University. In 1923, Boldt's daughter, Mrs. Alfred G. Miles, donated US$50,000 to the university for the construction of Boldt Tower to honor her father's memory. Boldt Hall is also named for him.  Three bricks from the original structure of the Waldorf-Astoria Hotel were incorporated into the building. Saying that his father always sympathized with an eager student whose only impediment to higher education was a lack of funds, Boldt's son George C. Boldt Jr. established a scholarship program at Cornell bearing his father's name in 1922.

During his lifetime, Boldt was a frequent donor to Cornell University, the American Red Cross, many local hospitals and built a library at Alexandria Bay, New York. Boldt also helped put at least 75 young men through college, doing this anonymously. He also assisted those in business who were having financial difficulties and  told employees at his hotels if they were having monetary problems, his door was always open to them.

Boldt's will equally divided US$15 million between his son and daughter, with a request to his children that they continue to financially support the charities he had donated to in the past.  While the will gave his children the right to dispose of any or all of Boldt's properties, they made no plans to sell any of their father's holdings, with George Charles Boldt Jr. assuming the presidency of the company his father began.

Family
From his marriage to Louise Augusta Kehrer, he had two children: George Charles Boldt Jr. and Clover Louise Boldt, later Mrs. Alfred Graham Miles, and three granddaughters.

Gallery

See also

Notes

References
Citations

Bibliography

Further reading
 Malo, Paul. Boldt Castle: In Search of the Lost Story. Fulton, N.Y.: Laurentian Press, 2001.

External links
 Boldt Castle – official website
 Ian Coristine's Thousand Islands Castles & Grand Cottages Gallery
 Thousand Islands Life

1851 births
1916 deaths
American hoteliers
German emigrants to the United States
People from the Province of Pomerania
Burials at Woodlawn Cemetery (Bronx, New York)
Waldorf Astoria New York
People from Montecito, California